Dr. Bärbel Silvia Koribalski is a research scientist working on galaxy formation at CSIRO's Australia Telescope National Facility (ATNF), part of CSIRO's Astronomy & Space Science (CASS). She obtained her PhD at the University of Bonn in Germany and is noted for studies of nearby galaxies. In 2011 she received CSIRO's Newton Turner Award. She is also a project leader of the ASKAP HI All-Sky Survey, known as WALLABY.

Research 
Galaxy formation and evolution. Gas kinematics of galaxies using the HI 21-cm spectral line of neutral hydrogen. Radio observations with the Australia Telescope Compact Array (ATCA), also known as the Paul Wild Observatory in Narrabri, named after John Paul Wild, Chief of CSIRO's Division of Radiophysics and later Chairman of CSIRO (1978-1985). Study of galaxy groups, e.g. Dorado Group with V.A. Kilborn et al.

Current and planned major HI surveys of galaxies:
 "HI Parkes All Sky Survey" (HIPASS) 
 "Local Volume HI Survey" (LVHIS), conducted with the Australia Telescope Compact Array (ATCA) in Narrabri - Principal Investigator
 "ASKAP HI All-Sky Survey" (known as WALLABY) - Principal Investigator
 HI surveys with the Square Kilometre Array (SKA)

Personal Background 
Born in Wuppertal, Germany, and grown up in Köln on the Rhine, studied physics at the Rheinische Friedrich-Wilhelms Universitaet Bonn.

Hobbies: Athletics

Career 
Physics Diploma (1990) and PhD (Otto Hahn Medal, 1993) - University of Bonn, Germany
 Newton Turner  Award 2011
 CSIRO - OCE Science Leader, from 2012

Professional associations 
 International Astronomical Union (IAU)
 Australian Society of Astronomy (ASA)

Publications 
 Dr. Bärbel Koribalski's publications - source SAO/NASA Astrophysics Data System (ADS)

See also 
 Peekaboo Galaxy

References

External links 
Dr. Bärbel Koribalski's homepage
Google Scholar
OCE Science Leader Dr. Bärbel Koribalski
Encyclopedia of Australian Science Biographical Entry 
Career profile, 1996, WiseNet

Australian astrophysicists
Radio astronomers
20th-century German astronomers
21st-century Australian astronomers
University of Bonn alumni
Living people
1964 births
German emigrants to Australia